Joo Chiat Single Member Constituency was a single member constituency (SMC) located in the eastern region of Singapore. The SMC encompasses the areas of Joo Chiat, Katong, opera estate, Siglap and a portion of Telok Kurau. It had previously existed from 1959 until 1988, when it was merged with neighbouring constituencies to form Bedok Group Representation Constituency (Bedok GRC). It was reformed just before the 2001 general election after being carved out from East Coast Group Representation Constituency. The seat has been held by the People's Action Party since its reformation that year and was contested again in 2006.

Bukit Panjang and Mountbatten currently share the roots where it has been interrupted due to Group Representation Constituency system, where it had been merged into the respective bigger constituencies at different times. No other constituencies has survived longer without the interruption after Chua Chu Kang had been merged into Chua Chu Kang GRC. 

After the HDB flats demolished in Joo Chiat constituency, the constituency was merged into Marine Parade GRC in 2015.

Member of Parliament

Elections

Elections in the 2010s

Elections in the 2000s

Elections in the 1980s

Elections in the 1970s

Elections in the 1960s

Elections in the 1950s

References
2011 General Election's result
2006 General Election's result
2001 General Election's result
1984 General Election's result
1980 General Election's result
1976 General Election's result
1972 General Election's result
1968 General Election's result
1966 (Third) November By-Election's result - There were 3 by elections held in 1966 on various constituencies
1963 General Election's result
1959 General Election's result

Singaporean electoral divisions
Bedok
Geylang
Marine Parade